Novo Horizonte do Oeste is a municipality located in the Brazilian state of Rondônia. Its population was 8,329 (2020) and its area is 843 km².

References

Municipalities in Rondônia